Sri Sampath Vinayagar is the prominent  deity of Visakhapatnam locals. The temple is located in Asilmetta of Visakhapatnam city.

History
This temple was built in 1962 by T.S. Rajeshwaran and T.S. Selvaganesan later it comes under Endowments Department of Andhara Pradesh.

About
Sampath Vinayagar Temple is very popular. In this region, people still follow the custom to perform ritual of any newly purchased vehicle. This temple is situated at one of the busiest areas in city and every year Ganesh Chaturthi is celebrated in a great pomp. People believe this as a lucky temple of the city

References

Hindu temples in Visakhapatnam district